Cyclopentadienylchromium tricarbonyl dimer is the organochromium compound with the formula Cp2Cr2(CO)6, where Cp is C5H5.  A dark green crystalline solid. It is the subject of research it exists in measureable equilibrium quantities with the monometallic radical CpCr(CO)3.

Structure and synthesis
The six CO ligands are terminal, and the Cr-Cr bond distance is 3.281 Å, 0.06 Å longer than the related dimolybdenum compound. The compound is prepared by treatment of chromium hexacarbonyl with sodium cyclopentadienide followed by oxidation of the resulting NaCr(CO)3(C5H5).

Related compounds
 Cyclopentadienylmolybdenum tricarbonyl dimer
 Cyclopentadienyltungsten tricarbonyl dimer

References

Organochromium compounds
Carbonyl complexes
Dimers (chemistry)
Half sandwich compounds
Cyclopentadienyl complexes
Chemical compounds containing metal–metal bonds